The church of St Mary Magdalene is a Church of England religious building in North Ockendon, Greater London, England (and within the Upminster post town). It is a Grade I listed building and is dedicated to Jesus' companion Mary Magdalene.

History 
Most of the church building dates back to the fourteenth century, on the site of an earlier church. The tower was built in the fifteenth century and was used by the Reverend William Derham in the first accurate measurement of the speed of sound. The church was heavily restored in 1858 by Richard Armstrong, and his work was paid for by Richard Benyon of Cranham Hall, a wealthy local landowner. A recent extension to the north side was completed in 2003.

Interior 
The pulpit is of Elizabethan appearance, but is more likely to be 17th century. The baptismal font and royal arms (made of Coade stone) were both made in 1842. The reredos behind the altar, depicting the Last Supper, dates to 1879. The numerous monuments are mostly associated with the local Poyntz family. Monumental brasses include one to former vicar Edward Foley Evans, who died in 1933. The main monument is a large stone effigy of Sir Gabriel Poyntz (1538–1608) and his wife Etheldreda, who are lying on a marble tomb chest. Over them is a wooden tester without column supports, decorated with images of the sun, moon, clouds and stars.

Liturgy 

North Ockendon Church is notable for its retention of choral Prayer book services, in addition to contemporary Biblical liturgy and a sung Eucharist in modern English.

Music 

St. Mary Magdalene's has an established choir which accompanies the weekly choral services in addition to other events. The choir's regular repertoire notably includes a number of largely obscure Victorian compositions. The organ is a 2 manual Brindley & Foster instrument currently in the care of Martin M Cross builders (Grays) and on which the pitch is rather sharp at A=460.

Bells 

The tower has a peal of 6 bells hung for change ringing. They are a descending scale in G major. The heaviest bell, the Tenor, weighs approx. 9½ cwt. The bells are rung from the ground floor and, unusually, are hung in an anticlockwise direction.

Churchyard 

The churchyard contains war graves of three British Army personnel of World War I. There is also a well, said to be associated with Saint Cedd.

References

Church of England church buildings in the London Borough of Havering
14th-century church buildings in England
Grade I listed churches in London